Smaug breyeri, also known commonly as the Waterberg dragon lizard or the Waterberg girdled lizard, is a species of lizard in the family Cordylidae. The species is endemic to South Africa.

Etymology
The specific name, breyeri, is in honor of Dutch naturalist Hermann Gottfried Breyer.

Habitat

Description

Reproduction
S. breyeri is viviparous. Two to four young are born in summer.

References

Further reading
FitzSimons VF (1943). The Lizards of South Africa. Transvaal Museum Memoir No. 1. Pretoria: Transvaal Museum. xvi + 528 pp. (Cordylus warreni breyeri, new combination).
Stanley EL, Bauer AM, Jackman TR, Branch WR, Mouton PLFN (2011). "Between a rock and a hard polytomy: Rapid radiation in the rupicolous girdled lizards (Squamata: Cordylidae)". Molecular Phylogenetics and Evolution 58 (1): 53–70. (Smaug breyeri, new combination).
Van Dam GPF (1921). "Descriptions of new species of Zonurus, and notes on the species of Zonurus occurring in the Transvaal". Annals of the Transvaal Museum 7 (4): 239–243. (Zonurus breyeri, new species).

breyeri
Reptiles of South Africa
Reptiles described in 1921